Stony Hill is a residential neighbourhood in St. Andrew Parish, Surrey County, on the northern outskirts of Kingston, Jamaica.  it had a population of 8,388.

The St. Andrew Juvenile Remand Centre of the Department of Correctional Services, Jamaica is located in the Stony Hill.

References

Neighbourhoods in Kingston, Jamaica
Populated places in Saint Andrew Parish, Jamaica